Houstonia croftiae, the South Texas bluet or Croft's bluet, is a species of plants in the family Rubiaceae. It is known only from 9 counties in southern Texas: Hidalgo, Starr, Zapata, Webb, La Salle, Duval, Jim Wells, Refugio and San Patricio).

References

croftiae
Endemic flora of Texas
Plants described in 1887
Flora without expected TNC conservation status